Giacomo Boni (28 April 1688 – 7 January 1766) was an Italian painter of the late-Baroque period, active mainly in Genoa.

Biography

He was born in Bologna, and became a pupil of Marcantonio Franceschini, and later of the painter Carlo Cignani in Forlì. He returned and followed Franceschini to Genoa, then Crema, Piacenza, Lavino di Mezzo, Parma, and then Rome. He painted canvases for chapels in the church of San Filippo Neri in Genoa, and frescoes for their oratory chapter house. In Crema, he painted for the Chiesa del Carmine. In Piacenza, he painted in the church of Santa Maria del Popolo. He returned to Genoa in 1726, where he painted alongside Tommaso Aldrovandini in the Palazzo Durazzo. He painted the choir of San Pancrazio for the noble family of the Pallavicini. He also painted in the Palazzo Mari and in many others; and frescoed the vault of the oratory of Santa Maria della Costa, at Sanremo. In a chapel of San Giovanni Evangelista in Parma he painted alongside Giuseppe Carpi.

Lanzi speaks of Jacopo Boni working as an assistant to Franceschini in decorating the great hall of the Palazzo Pubblico. Among his pupils were Lorenzo Brusco (died 1763), Giuseppe Comotti, and Giuseppe Rossi (illuminator) (died 1796).

References

1688 births
1766 deaths
Painters from Bologna
17th-century Italian painters
Italian male painters
18th-century Italian painters
Painters from Genoa
Italian Baroque painters
18th-century Italian male artists